Hélder Fernando Cardoso da Costa (born 6 July 1995 in Selho - Guimarães) aka Helinho, is a Portuguese footballer who plays for Vizela, as a midfielder.

Football career
On 9 August 2014, Helinho made his professional debut with Vitória Guimarães B in a 2014–15 Segunda Liga match against Feirense, when he started and played the full game.

References

External links

Stats at LPFP 

1995 births
Living people
Portuguese footballers
Association football midfielders
Liga Portugal 2 players
Vitória S.C. B players
Sportspeople from Guimarães